Laurel Trivelpiece (1926, Nebraska – 1998) was an American poet and novelist.

Life
Trivelpiece worked in her youth as fruit-picker and later, after graduating from the University of California at Berkeley with a bachelor's degree in English Literature, as an editor and copy-writer for Macys and other department stores in the San Francisco Bay Area. She lived in Corte Madera, California.

Trivelpiece authored two poetry collections, four young adult novels, one adult novel, and prize-winning fiction and plays. Her second poetry collection, Blue Holes (Alice James Books, 1987), won the Beatrice Hawley Award, and one of her poems was included in Best American Poetry 1995. Her poems also appeared in literary journals and magazines including Poetry, The Massachusetts Review, The American Poetry Review,
and The Malahat Review.

Her short story Gentle Constancy (Denver Quarterly, Fall) was acknowledged in the Distinctive Short Stories, 1970 list  in The Best American Short Stories, 1971.  Houghton Mifflin Co.  .

Awards
 1987 Beatrice Hawley Award

Published works
Poetry Collections
 
 

Young Adult Novels
 
 
 
 

Adult Novels
 

Anthology Publications

References

External links
 Alice James Books > Poems by Laurel Trivelpiece
 Review: Virginia Quarterly Review > Issues > Autumn 1978 > pp.127-148 > Recent Books > Legless in Flight by Laurel Trivelpiece

American women poets
1926 births
1998 deaths
20th-century American novelists
American women novelists
People from Corte Madera, California
Writers from Nebraska
20th-century American poets
20th-century American women writers
Novelists from California